Alan John Watson, Baron Watson of Richmond  (born 3 February 1941) is a UK-based broadcaster, Liberal Democrat politician and leadership communications consultant.

Early life and education

Lord Watson of Richmond is the son of the Rev. John William Watson and Edna Mary Peters. He was educated at the Diocesan College, Cape Town in South Africa and Kingswood School in Bath. He was an Open Scholar in history at Jesus College, Cambridge 1959, a State Scholar 1959 and was awarded an MA in 1963. He was the Vice-President of the Cambridge Union.

Watson's German-born wife Karen is an artist: they have two sons, Stephen and Martin.

Career

Broadcasting

Watson joined the BBC after graduating from Cambridge University in 1963, and later became a regular presenter for The Money Programme on BBC Two and Panorama on BBC One. He also reported on London Weekend Television, Radio 4 and the BBC World Service, and wrote and presented award-winning documentaries over many years.
He was one of the studio contributors to the BBC's June 1970 Election Night television programme.

He is a Fellow and Former Chairman of the Royal Television Society. From 1976 to 1980 he was responsible for media at the European Commission.

Politics

In politics, Watson's notable role was as President of the Liberal Party. He was appointed CBE in 1985 and, on 23 July 1999 was elevated to the House of Lords with a Life Peerage as Baron Watson of Richmond, of Richmond in the London Borough of Richmond upon Thames. He is a member of the House of Lords Select Committee on the European Union.

He stood for election four times: as the Liberal candidate for Richmond in the general elections of October 1974 and 1979, and as the Liberal candidate (SDP-Liberal Alliance) for Richmond and Barnes in the general elections of 1983 and 1987. On all four occasions, he came in second place, losing to the Conservatives.

Outside of the United Kingdom, Lord Watson is Chair of the Albanian British Chamber of Commerce and is a Member of the European Parliament's High Level Group on Romania. His political interests are the "worldwide use of English, EU enlargement and transatlantic relationship".

Leadership communications

Lord Watson was Chairman of CTN Communications until retirement, a creative communications agency based on St Martin's Lane in central London. He advises the leaders of major UK and international companies on their communications, with clients including BP, BAE Systems and Tesco.

Board memberships

Business

 Executive Chairman, CTN Communications
 Executive Chairman, Havas Media
 Chairman, Nexus Partnerships
 Chairman, Coca-Cola European Advisory Board
 Non-Executive Chairman, I-COMP

Not-for-profit

 Chairman, The Council of Commonwealth Societies
 Chairman, The European Movement UK
 Chairman, The Father Thames Trust
 Chairman, The Arcadia Advisory Board
 British Chairman, Königswinter Anglo-German Conference
 President, British-German Association
 Co-Chair, Jamestown 1607-2007 British Committee
 Non-Executive Chairman, Raisin Social (a wine importer)
 Member, The Executive Committee of the Pilgrims Society
 Member, The Prince of Wales Business Leaders' Forum
 Patron, The Richmond Society
 Patron, Museum of Richmond
 Patron, The Richmond in Europe Association
 International Chairman Emeritus, The English-Speaking Union
 Chairman Emeritus, Royal Television Society
 Former Executive Board Member, UNICEF UK
 President, The European-Atlantic Movement (TEAM)

Positions at educational institutions

Lord Watson holds a range of visiting and honorary posts at universities in the United Kingdom and abroad.

United Kingdom

 High Steward, Cambridge University
 Visiting Fellow, Oriel College, Oxford University
 Honorary Fellow, Jesus College, Cambridge
 Chairman, Cambridge University Chemistry Advisory Board
 Life Patron, Cambridge's Churchill Archives Centre
 Chairman, The Cambridge Foundation
 Honorary Professor, University of Birmingham
 Trustee, The American International University in London
 Former Chairman, Governors at Westminster College, Oxford
 President, The British Accreditation Council for Independent Further and Higher Education

Overseas

 Honorary Doctor, St Lawrence University, USA
 Visiting Professor, Leuven, Belgium
 Honorary Professor, Saint Petersburg State University, Russia
 Honorary Professor, Korea University, South Korea
 Trustee, The Centre for British Studies, Humboldt University, Berlin

Publications

Europe at Risk

Europe at Risk was Lord Waton's first publication, released in 1972.

The Germans: Who Are They Now?

The Germans: Who Are They Now? is a non-fiction book, first published in 1992.

Eminent Europeans: personalities who shaped contemporary Europe

Eminent Europeans: personalities who shaped contemporary Europe is a collection of 17 essays on the personalities who have shaped modern Europe, for which Lord Watson contributed the essay entitled Thatcher and Kohl: Old Rivalries Revisited. The book was published in 1996, and edited by Martyn Bond, Julie Smith and William Wallace.

Jamestown: The Voyage of English

Published in 2007, Jamestown: The Voyage of English is an exploration of the global significance of the arrival of the Godspeed, the Susan Constant and the Discovery on America's East Coast in 1607. These three ships carried the ideas and the language which would shape the modern world. Lord Watson tells the story of a precarious venture that nearly failed. But it succeeded against the odds, planting the seeds of representative government, capitalism and the rule of law. These ideas were expressed in a language which had just reached a peak of power and vitality – the English of Shakespeare, Tyndale and Cranmer's Prayer Book. The year 1607 marks the start of the voyage of English from the language of 4 million inhabitants of the British Isles to its role as today's working language of the global village used by almost 2 billion people world-wide.

The Queen and the USA

The Queen and the USA is a non-fiction book published in March 2012 by Dementi Milestone Publishing. During 2012, Queen Elizabeth II celebrated the 60th anniversary of her role as Queen of the United Kingdom. This book explores and celebrates the special relationship between the American and British people during this period, and honours Queen Elizabeth II for her role and contribution to a friendship recognised throughout the world. Co-authored by Horace Edward "Chip" Mann, the book is highly visual, and includes photographs of the Queen with twelve US Presidents.

Churchill's Legacy, Two Speeches to Save the World

Published in 2016, Churchill's Legacy, Two Speeches to Save the World is a non-fiction book published in September 2016 by Bloomsbury Publishing to mark the 70th anniversary of Churchill's speeches in 1946, first in March in Fulton, Missouri, often known as the Iron Curtain speech, and then in September in Zurich, Switzerland, often known as the United States of Europe speech.

Honours and awards

Below is a list of Lord Watson's most notable awards. For educational honours, please see the above section, Positions at Educational Institutions.

 Commander of the Order of the British Empire, 1985
 Federal Cross of Merit (Germany), 1995 (for his "significant and enduring contribution" to understanding between Germany and Britain)
 Grand Cross of Merit (Germany), 2001
 Commander's Grand Cross of the Romanian Order of Merit, 2004
 Churchill Medal, 2005
 The Loyola Schools Award for Outstanding Achievement in the Promotion of English by Manila University, 2005
 Knights Grand Cross of the German Order of Merit, 2007
 Knight of Honor of the Order of St. George, 2016

References

External links
Official website
Announcement of his introduction at the House of Lords

Watson of Richmond
Watson of Richmond
Alumni of Diocesan College, Cape Town
Alumni of Jesus College, Cambridge
Watson of Richmond
Commanders of the Order of the British Empire
Fellows of Jesus College, Cambridge
Grand Crosses of the Order of the Star of Romania
Knights Commander of the Order of Merit of the Federal Republic of Germany
Watson of Richmond
People educated at Kingswood School, Bath
People from Port Elizabeth
Presidents of the Liberal Party (UK)
Life peers created by Elizabeth II